The 2021 Canadian Olympic Curling Pre-Trials were held from October 25 to 31 at the Queens Place Emera Centre in Liverpool, Nova Scotia. The event qualified two teams for the 2021 Canadian Olympic Curling Trials in Saskatoon, Saskatchewan.

Qualification process
Fourteen men's teams and fourteen women's team will qualify for the event. Nine men's and ten women's teams qualified based on their World Curling Team Rankings as of July 2021. Teams also had to have three of their four members from their 2020–21 season lineups still intact. Additionally, the three men's and two women's teams that did not advance to the trials through the 2021 Canadian Curling Trials Direct-Entry Event qualified for the event. The final two teams of each gender were the two qualifiers from the 2021 Canadian Curling Pre-Trials Direct-Entry Event.

Men

Women

Men

Teams
The teams are listed as follows:

Round-robin standings
Final round-robin standings

Round-robin results
All draw times are listed in Atlantic Daylight Time (UTC−03:00).

Draw 2
Monday, October 25, 9:00 pm

Draw 3
Tuesday, October 26, 8:00 am

Draw 5
Tuesday, October 26, 4:00 pm

Draw 6
Tuesday, October 26, 8:00 pm

Draw 7
Wednesday, October 27, 8:00 am

Draw 8
Wednesday, October 27, 12:00 pm

Draw 10
Wednesday, October 27, 8:00 pm

Draw 11
Thursday, October 28, 8:00 am

Draw 13
Thursday, October 28, 4:00 pm

Draw 14
Thursday, October 28, 8:00 pm

Draw 15
Friday, October 29, 8:00 am

Draw 16
Friday, October 29, 12:00 pm

Draw 17
Friday, October 29, 4:00 pm

Draw 18
Friday, October 29, 8:00 pm

Playoffs

A Semifinals
Saturday, October 30, 1:30 pm

A Final
Sunday, October 31, 9:00 am

Winner qualifies for 2021 Canadian Olympic Curling Trials.

Loser drops to B Final.

B Quarterfinals
Saturday, October 30, 7:00 pm

B Semifinal
Sunday, October 31, 2:00 pm

B Final
Sunday, October 31, 7:30 pm

Winner qualifies for 2021 Canadian Olympic Curling Trials.

Women

Teams
The teams are listed as follows:

Round-robin standings
Final round-robin standings

Round-robin results
All draw times are listed in Atlantic Daylight Time (UTC−03:00).

Draw 1
Monday, October 25, 5:00 pm

Draw 2
Monday, October 25, 9:00 pm

Draw 3
Tuesday, October 26, 8:00 am

Draw 4
Tuesday, October 26, 12:00 pm

Draw 6
Tuesday, October 26, 8:00 pm

Draw 7
Wednesday, October 27, 8:00 am

Draw 9
Wednesday, October 27, 4:00 pm

Draw 10
Wednesday, October 27, 8:00 pm

Draw 11
Thursday, October 28, 8:00 am

Draw 12
Thursday, October 28, 12:00 pm

Draw 14
Thursday, October 28, 8:00 pm

Draw 15
Friday, October 29, 8:00 am

Draw 16
Friday, October 29, 12:00 pm

Draw 17
Friday, October 29, 4:00 pm

Playoffs

A Semifinals
Saturday, October 30, 1:30 pm

A Final
Saturday, October 30, 7:00 pm

Winner qualifies for 2021 Canadian Olympic Curling Trials.

Loser drops to B Final.

B Quarterfinals
Saturday, October 30, 7:00 pm

B Semifinal
Sunday, October 31, 9:00 am

B Final
Sunday, October 31, 2:00 pm

Winner qualifies for 2021 Canadian Olympic Curling Trials.

References

External links
 Info about Trials Qualification

2021 in Canadian curling
2021 in Nova Scotia
Curling competitions in Nova Scotia
October 2021 sports events in Canada